Holyman House is an iconic Art Deco building in the central business district of Launceston, Tasmania, Australia. It was designed by H. S. East and Roy Sharrington Smith architects, of Launceston, with Clive Steele, of Melbourne, as consulting engineer. The building was built in 1936 to house the various branches of Holymans shipping and aviation interests as well as an automobile showroom for Holyman's automotive division. The building was designed to reflect the bold futuristic vision of the Holyman Company with the sleek curves, neon-lit spire and modern steel frame construction.  Holyman House was most infamously the headquarters of Australian National Airways, an evolution of Holyman's Airways. After the fall of the Holyman's empire in the 1950s, it was sold to Ansett Australia and eventually divided into office spaces. Holyman House now houses a travel centre on the ground level corner allotment where the flight lounge used to be.

Gallery

References

Art Deco architecture in Tasmania
Buildings and structures in Launceston, Tasmania
Aviation in Australia
Tasmanian Heritage Register